Howard Lake is a natural lake in northwestern Mendocino County, California, located in the Mendocino National Forest at an elevation of . The lake hosts a small campground and is a popular primitive camping experience. In some years, the U.S. Forest Service stocks the lake with rainbow trout.

See also 
 List of lakes in California

References

External links
 Howard Lake Campground

Lakes of California
Mendocino National Forest
Lakes of Mendocino County, California
Lakes of Northern California